Eaglesham is a hamlet in northern Alberta, Canada within Birch Hills County, located  north of Highway 49, approximately  northeast of Grande Prairie.

The hamlet takes its name from Eaglesham in Scotland.

Eaglesham is primarily a farming community. Eaglesham also has a small K-12 school with 80 students.

Demographics 

See also 
List of communities in Alberta
List of designated places in Alberta
List of former urban municipalities in Alberta
List of hamlets in Alberta
Eaglesham, Scotland

References 

Birch Hills County
Hamlets in Alberta
Designated places in Alberta
Former villages in Alberta
Populated places disestablished in 1996